Robert Allen (born October 14, 1945) is an American legislator who has served as Republican member of the Pennsylvania House of Representatives. He represented the 125th legislative district from 1989 through 2006.

Biography
Allen attended Pottsville High School and earned a degree in business administration from Lycoming College in 1968. He graduated from the Pittsburgh Institute of Mortuary Science in 1969.

He was defeated by Gary L. Hornberger in the 2006 Republican primary because of his support for the controversial 2005 legislative pay raise. Hornberger went on to lose the general election to Tim Seip.

References

External links
  official PA House website (archived)

Members of the Pennsylvania House of Representatives
Politicians from Pottsville, Pennsylvania
Lycoming College alumni
1945 births
Living people